Seran may refer to:

 Çarshovë, Albania
 Seh Ran Bala, Iran
 Seh Ran Pain, Iran

See also 
 Seh Ran (disambiguation)
 Saran (disambiguation)